Percnia is a genus of moths in the family Geometridae.

Species
The following species are recognised in the genus Percnia:
Percnia albinigrata Warren, 1896
Percnia belluaria Guenée, 1858
Percnia confusa Warren, 1894
Percnia contrasqualida Inoue, 1992
Percnia cordiforma Inoue, 1978
Percnia ductaria Walker, 1862
Percnia felinaria Guenee, 1858
Percnia foraria Guenee, 1858
Percnia fumidaria Leech, 1897
Percnia giraffata Guenée, 1858
Percnia grisearia Leech, 1897
Percnia interfusa Warren, 1893
Percnia longitermen Prout, 1914
Percnia luridaria (Leech, 1897)
Percnia maculata Moore, 1867
Percnia prouti (Wehrli, 1925)
Percnia suffusa Wileman, 1914
BOLD:AAZ6058 (Percnia sp.)

References

Natural History Museum Lepidoptera genus database

Ennominae